Ismael ibni Punjungan Kiram II (also spelled as Esmail Kiram II) (9 November 1939 – 19 September 2015) was a self-proclaimed Sultan of the Sultanate of Sulu (now part of Philippines, Malaysia and Indonesia) from 12 March 2001 until his death on 19 September 2015.

Biography

Jamalul Kiram III was subsequently abdicated  for leaving Sulu after his coronation in 1986. Self-proclaimed Sultan, Jamalul likewise abrogated the authority of the Philippine government to retake Sabah from Malaysia in 1989. Jamalul Kiram III's death changes nothing in the hierarchy, being an abdicated sultan was allowed to undertake the supposed homecoming of Raja Muda Agbimuddin Kiram in Sabah, which turn bloody when the Malaysian forces rounded up the group of Raja Muda Agbimuddin when they illegally intrude Sabah. Around 68 of his followers died during the standoff. Shortly after, upon the death of Jamalul Kiram III, Agbimuddin Kiram was restored as Rajah Muda of Esmail Kiram II being mistaken next in line to Jamalul Kiram III to the succession of the throne. Esmail D. Kiram II, through no approval of the Royal House of Kiram. He proclaimed himself as Sultan in 1999 and was subsequently crowned on 12 March 2001, as his older brother Jamalul Kiram III moved to Manila after his coronation in 1986 for the latter's dialysis treatment. Other unrecognised heirs and pretenders to the throne continue to claim the heritage of the now-politically defunct but traditionally and culturally alive sultanate. He is the younger brother of Jamalul Kiram III who were both sons of Datu Punjungan Kiram the second son of late Sultan Mawallil Wasit.

In November 2012, Jamalul Kiram III was elected to take over Sabah, as leader being abdicated is regarded as Sultan of Sulu. Ismael Kiram II allowed him as his co-coregent, as Jamalul lives in Taguig, Metro Manila, far away from Sulu. Ismael, as the reigning sultan, administers the sultanate's court in Sulu. The nonexistent title was used to address Esmail as "Sultan Bantilan" or "Caretaker Sultan" of Sulu however it was a violation of the law of succession to be called caretaker. When he died in 2015, he was succeeded by the new sultan, Phugdalon Kiram II.

References

Claimants of the Sultanate of Sulu throne
Filipino datus, rajas and sultans
Filipino Muslims
People from Taguig
People from Sulu
1939 births
2015 deaths